= Richard Stricker =

Dutch footballer

Personal information
- Date of birth: 3 November 1970 (age 55)
- Place of birth: Amsterdam, Netherlands
- Position: Defender

Senior career*
Years	Team	Apps	(Gls)
1995–1999	Den Bosch		
2000–2001	Telstar		

Managerial career
- 2010–2012: Volendam (youth)
- 2012: Volendam (assistant)
- 2013–2014: Royal Antwerp (assistant)
- 2014–2015: Royal Antwerp
- 2015–2016: Sparta Rotterdam (assistant)
- * Club domestic league appearances and goals

Richard Stricker (born 3 November 1970) is a Dutch football coach and former player. He played as a defender.
